David Lubar (born March 16, 1954) is an author of numerous books for teens.  He is also a video game programmer, who programmed Super Breakout for the Game Boy and Frogger for both the Super Nintendo Entertainment System and Game Boy. He designed Frogger 2: Swampy's Revenge for the Nintendo Game Boy Color.

Biography
Lubar was born and raised in Morristown, New Jersey. As a boy he frequented the school library where his mother worked, as well as the town library and county library. He attended Rutgers University and received a degree in philosophy. After graduating, he tried to write full-time, but a low income forced him to pursue more lucrative options. David married his wife around this time in 1977. He began writing for Creative Computing in 1980.

In 1982, Lubar was offered a job designing and programming video games in California. There he designed and translated video games for Atari, Nintendo Game Boy, Apple 2 and the Nintendo Entertainment System.

After realizing he still wanted to write, Lubar returned to writing in 1994 while still working as a developer. By 1995, he had sold six books, and the company he worked for had gone out of business. During 1998 and 1999 Lubar started programming for the Nintendo Game Boy while putting writing to the side, but he returned to writing shortly after. From 2000 to 2005, Lubar wrote short stories for various collections such as Ribbiting Tales, Lost and Found and Shattered.

Today, Lubar writes from his house. He has a daughter, Alison, who is a teacher.

Works

Books for Young Readers

Standalones 

 Monster Road (1999)
Wizards of the Game (2003)
Dog Days (2004)
Punished! (2005)
Toon Out (2007)
Emperor of the Universe

 Emperor of the Universe (2019)
 The Clone Catastrophe (2021)
 The Emperor's Last Stand(coming September 2023)

Nathan Abercrombie, Accidental Zombie

My Rotten Life (2009)
Dead Guy Spy (2010)
Goop Soup (2010)
The Big Stink (2010)
Enter the Zombie (2011)

Monsterrific Tales 

 Hyde and Shriek (2013)
 The Vanishing Vampire (2013)
 The Unwilling Witch (2013)
 The Wavering Werewolf (2014)
 The Gloomy Ghost (2014)
 The Bully Bug (2014)

Looniverse 

 Stranger Things (2013)
 Meltdown Madness (2013)
 Dinosaur Disaster (2013)
 Stage Fright (2014)

Monster Itch 

 Ghost Attack (2017)
 Vampire Trouble (2017)

Short Stories

The Psychozone 

 Kidzilla and Other Tales (1997)
 The Witch's Monkey and Other Tales (1997)

Weenies 

In the Land of the Lawn Weenies (2003)
Invasion of the Road Weenies (2005)
The Curse of the Campfire Weenies (2007)
The Battle of the Red Hot Pepper Weenies (2009)
Attack of the Vampire Weenies (2011)
Beware the Ninja Weenies (2012)
Wipeout of the Wireless Weenies (2014)
Strikeout of the Bleacher Weenies (2016)
Check Out the Library Weenies (2018)

Teeny Weenies 

Freestyle Frenzy (2019)
The Intergalactic Petting Zoo (2019)
The Boy Who Cried Wool (2019)
My Favorite President (2019)
Fishing for Pets (2020)
The Eighth Octopus (2020)

Books for Teens

Standalones 

 Flip (2003)
Dunk (2004)
Extremities: Stories of Death, Murder, and Revenge (2013)
Character, Driven (2016)

Talents 

Hidden Talents (1999)
True Talents (2007)

Scott Hudson 

 Sleeping Freshmen Never Lie (2005)
 Sophomores and Other Oxymorons (2015)

Video games

Apple II
Bumper Blocks
Obstacle Course
Killing Zone

Atari 2600
Fantastic Voyage
Worm War I
Nexar
Flash Gordon
Space Master X-7
Bumper Bash
My Golf
River Raid II, a sequel to River Raid based on a concept by Dan Kitchen

Atari 8-bit family
Pastfinder
Alpha Shield

Nintendo Entertainment System
The Simpsons: Bart vs. the World

Game Boy
Home Alone
Frogger
Frogger 2: Swampy's Revenge

Further reading

References

External links

  
 

1954 births
Living people
People from Morristown, New Jersey
American children's writers
Video game programmers